Morgan Elizabeth York is an American novelist, podcaster and former child actress from Burbank, California best known for her roles as Kim Baker in the first 2 films of Cheaper by the Dozen, Lulu in The Pacifier (2005) and as Sarah in the Disney Channel sitcom Hannah Montana.

York retired from acting at age 17 in 2010 is currently an author, podcaster and book publisher living in New York City.

Career
Born in Burbank, California, she made her on-screen debut at just 18 months old in a commercial for Braun ThermoScan Thermometer. Her first major film role was came in 2003 when she starred in Cheaper by the Dozen as Kim Baker, which won York and her cast-mates the Young Artist Award for "Best Young Ensemble in a Feature Film" for their performances the following year. Following the awards, she starred as Lulu Plummer in The Pacifier, whose performance was well received. In the summer of 2005, York headed back to Toronto to film Cheaper by the Dozen 2. From 2006 to 2010, York appeared in 11 episodes of the Disney Channel sitcom Hannah Montana, after which she retired from acting. She stated she would not return to acting in the future.

Personal life
Morgan York was born in Burbank, California, a suburb within the Los Angeles County. Following the conclusion of her Sarah character run on Hannah Montana, she decided to retire from acting to pursue her passion of authoring young adult novels. On her blog and via her TikTok handle, she stated the "the older I got, and the more I felt like writing was my true calling (authoring young adult novels)." This was later cited in a number of sources a decade later whiles recollecting television productions aimed at children and adolescents made in the 2000s and 2010s and its stars making comebacks in the form of reunions following the onset of the global COVID-19 pandemic. She graduated with a self-designed degree in "Writing Fiction: Listening, Absorbing, and Creating" at University of Redlands in 2015. In 2012, she wrote a blog post saying that she was intending to pursue a career as a young adult novelist.

On 14 July 2019, she shared her moments of marriage to Danny Haddad via Twitter.

Filmography

Awards and nominations

References

External links 
 
 
 EFilmCritic interview (June 26, 2005; archived)
 Morgan York as "tolstoyce" on Twitch

21st-century American actresses
American child actresses
American film actresses
American television actresses
American women writers
Living people
University of Redlands alumni
Writers from California